The Free Democratic Party (GDR) (DDR) was an opposition political party in East Germany. The appeal for its formation was made on 25 November 1989 in Berlin by those East German liberals who doubted the ability of the former block party Liberal Democratic Party of Germany to reform itself. It was formally founded 4 February 1990, and 12 February 1990 it joined the Association of Free Democrats for the Volkskammer elections.

See also
Liberalism
Contributions to liberal theory
Liberalism worldwide
List of liberal parties
Liberal democracy
Liberalism in Germany

External links
Freie Demokratische Partei of the GDR from chronik der wende

1990 disestablishments in East Germany
1990 establishments in East Germany
Defunct liberal political parties
Defunct political parties in Germany
Peaceful Revolution
Organizations of the Revolutions of 1989
Political parties disestablished in 1990
Political parties established in 1990
Political parties in East Germany